Harpers Wine & Spirit Trade Review or simply Harpers is a British information service for the wine and spirit industry.

History
Harpers Wine & Spirit Trade Review was founded in 1878.

In 2009, Wine & Spirit merged into Harpers Magazine to form Harpers Wine & Spirit Trade Review. The magazine was subject to a major re-launch in 2013 with a revamped digital offering which now provides news and analysis in advance of the print magazine. Current owner Agile Media acquired Harpers Wine & Spirit Trade Review from William Reed Business Media in 2015.

Description
Harpers Wine & Spirit Trade Review has a fully subscribed circulation. The current editor is Andrew Catchpole.

References

External links
Harpers Wine and Spirit Trade Review official site

1878 establishments in the United Kingdom
Alcohol in the United Kingdom
Weekly magazines published in the United Kingdom
Food and drink magazines
Magazines established in 1878
Wine magazines